Glassel railway station is a disused railway station in Britain. It served Glassel House, the Mill of Beltie and the local farms and the inhabitants of this rural area from 1859 to 1966 on the Deeside Railway that ran from Aberdeen (Joint) to Ballater.

History 
The station was opened in 1859 on the Deeside branch by the Aboyne Extension Railway and at first its services were operated by the Deeside Railway.  Later it became part of the GNoSR and at grouping merged with the London and North Eastern Railway. It stood 21.5 miles (34.5 km) from Aberdeen and 22.75 miles (36.5 km) from Ballater. It was closed to passengers on 28 February 1966. The line has been lifted and sections form part of the Deeside Way long-distance footpath. The station was unstaffed from circa 1964 when goods services were withdrawn.

Infrastructure

The station had a single platform and a waiting room and ticket office similar to those at Torphins, Lumphanan and elsewhere on the line, consisting of a rough-cast and brick built single-storey structure, with round-headed windows at the front and a central covered area. A station master's house stood just to the east of the main station buildings, constructed after 1866. A signal post is indicated on the platform in 1866.

At the east end of the platform was a shed that contained the ground frame or signal box that operated the points for the goods yard siding with its loading dock and weighing machine accessed by a lane at Glassel Village Hall. The line was single track and the stone platform was built on a straight section of track. The sidings were lifted by 1965 following the cessation of goods services.

Services
The line was chosen to trial the battery multiple unit and once introduced on 21 April 1958 the train service was doubled to six trains a day and in addition a Sunday service was reinstated.

The site today 
The much modified and enlarged station buildings survive as private dwellings.  The Royal Deeside Railway is located at Milton of Crathes some distance down the line towards Aberdeen.

References

Sources
 
 Maxtone, Graham and Cooper, Mike (2018). Then and Now on the Great North. V.1. GNoSR Association. .

External links
Film of the station and the Deeside line.

Disused railway stations in Aberdeenshire
Beeching closures in Scotland
Former Great North of Scotland Railway stations
Railway stations in Great Britain opened in 1859
Railway stations in Great Britain closed in 1966
1966 disestablishments in Scotland
1859 establishments in Scotland